Round 3 (stylized as #ROUND3) is the third studio album from Canadian pop singer Elise Estrada. It was released on July 29, 2014, under XOXO Entertainment Corp. label.

Track listing

References

External links 
#ROUND3 by Elise Estrada on iTunes

2014 albums
Elise Estrada albums